Jevohn Shepherd (born April 8, 1986) is a Canadian basketball executive who is the vice-president of basketball operations and general manager for the Ottawa Blackjacks of the Canadian Elite Basketball League (CEBL). He is a former professional basketball player, playing the majority of his career oversees.  Shepherd played college basketball for the Michigan Wolverines, and was a longtime member of the Canadian men's national basketball team. He also serves as a color commentator for the Toronto Raptors on TSN 1050.

High school 
Shepherd attended West Hill Collegiate Institute and Don Valley Junior High School in Toronto.

College career 
Shepherd played for Michigan in the Big Ten Conference of the NCAA Division I from 2005 to 2009.  As a senior, he captained the team to a second round appearance in the 2009 NCAA Men's Division I Basketball Tournament. The schools first appearance in the tournament in over a decade.

Professional career 
After graduating in 2009, Shepherd signed with the Halifax Rainmen of the Premier Basketball League.  He averaged 8.5 points per game in eleven games for the Rainmen.

Following the season, Shepherd signed with German second-tier team Giro-Live Ballers Osnabrück. In March 2011 he signed with Skyliners Frankfurt in Germany where he averaged 4.7 points and 2.1 rebounds in 15 games.

On July 22, 2011, Shepherd signed for Zorg en Zekerheid Leiden in the Dutch Basketball League (DBL).

In August 2014, he signed with Basket Barcellona of the Italian second division.

The next season, Shepherd signed with Italian first division side OpenjobMetis Varese for 2015–16.

On August 11, 2016, Shepherd signed with Spirou Charleroi of the Belgian Basketball League.

International career 
Shepherd has represented Canada at various levels of competition. 
He first played with a Canadian squad at the 2005 and 2007 World University Games, helping the team to a surprise bronze medal in the latter competition.  
He was called to the senior national team for the first time at the 2010 FIBA World Championship.
Shepherd concluded his tenure with the Canadian men's national team at the 2017 FIBA Americup helping Canada qualify for the 2019 FIBA World Championship

Post-playing career
On November 23, 2020, Shepherd signed as general manager of the Ottawa BlackJacks of the Canadian Elite Basketball League (CEBL).

References 

1986 births
Living people
2010 FIBA World Championship players
B.S. Leiden players
Basketball players from Toronto
Black Canadian basketball players
Canadian expatriate basketball people in Belgium
Canadian expatriate basketball people in France
Canadian expatriate basketball people in Germany
Canadian expatriate basketball people in Italy
Canadian expatriate basketball people in the Netherlands
Canadian expatriate basketball people in the United States
Canadian men's basketball players
Dutch Basketball League players
Élan Chalon players
Guelph Nighthawks players
Canadian expatriate basketball people in Romania
Michigan Wolverines men's basketball players
Pallacanestro Varese players
Paris Basketball players
Skyliners Frankfurt players
SLUC Nancy Basket players
Small forwards
Spirou Charleroi players
Victoria Libertas Pallacanestro players
Basketball executives
Canadian sports executives and administrators